Cheat Lake is a census-designated place in Monongalia County, West Virginia, United States, surrounding the Cheat Lake reservoir. The population was 9,930 at the 2020 census. It is included in the Morgantown metropolitan area.

Geography
Cheat Lake is located at  (39.666538, -79.852683).

Demographics

As of the census of 2000, there were 6,396 people, 2,511 households, and 1,822 families residing in the community. The racial makeup of the community was 95.61% White, 1.20% African American, 0.09% Native American, 1.88% Asian, 0.08% Pacific Islander, 0.05% from other races, and 1.09% from two or more races. Hispanic or Latino of any race were 0.55% of the population.

There were 2,511 households, out of which 35.4% had children under the age of 18 living with them, 63.8% were married couples living together, 6.6% had a female householder with no husband present, and 27.4% were non-families. 23.3% of all households were made up of individuals, and 5.9% had someone living alone who was 65 years of age or older. The average household size was 2.55 and the average family size was 3.03.

The age distribution of the community is 25.8% under the age of 18, 7.3% from 18 to 24, 30.1% from 25 to 44, 27.7% from 45 to 64, and 9.1% who were 65 years of age or older. The median age was 38 years. For every 100 females, there were 98.0 males. For every 100 females age 18 and over, there were 96.3 males.

The median income for a household in the community was $48,594, and the median income for a family was $58,778. Males had a median income of $48,661 versus $28,920 for females. The per capita income for the community was $30,210. About 4.8% of families and 6.0% of the population were below the poverty line, including 6.7% of those under age 18 and 3.2% of those age 65 or over.

See also 
Cheat Lake – The lake that was formed in the 1920s as a result of damming the Cheat River.

Coopers Rock State Forest – A State Forest next to Cheat Lake that provides many outdoor activities.

Snake Hill Wildlife Management Area – State Area in the Cheat Lake area that provides hiking, hunting and views of the Cheat Lake area.

https://www.cheatlake.com – An informational website about Cheat Lake and the surrounding area.

References

Census-designated places in Monongalia County, West Virginia
Census-designated places in West Virginia
Morgantown metropolitan area